USS LST-851 was an LST-542-class tank landing ship in the United States Navy. Like many of her class, she was not named and is properly referred to by her hull designation.

History 
LST-851 was laid down on 10 August 1944 at Seneca, Illinois, by the Chicago Bridge & Iron Co.; launched on 8 November 1944; sponsored by Mrs. Gertrude B. Van Trigt; and commissioned on 30 November 1944.

During World War II, LST-851 was assigned to the Asiatic-Pacific theater and participated in the assault and occupation of Okinawa Gunto in May 1945. Following the war, the ship performed occupation duty in the Far East until mid-October 1945. She returned to the United States and was decommissioned on 24 April 1946 and struck from the Navy list on 8 May that same year. On 30 September 1946, LST-851 was sold to the Northwest Merchandising Service, Seattle, Wash.

LST-851 earned one battle star for World War II service.

Argentine service 
The final disposition is uncertain, but it is likely that LST-851 went to Argentina, where she was redesignated ARA BDT-1 (Buque Desembarco de Tanques), and later redesignated Q41.

Some confusion exists concerning whether BDT-1 was LST-851 or LST-875; however, sources indicate that LST-875 went to the Philippines.

References

Notes

Bibliography

External links 
  history.navy.mil: USS LST-851
  navsource.org: USS LST-851

 

LST-542-class tank landing ships
World War II amphibious warfare vessels of the United States
Ships built in Seneca, Illinois
1944 ships
LST-542-class tank landing ships of the Argentine Navy